Brignac may refer to:

Places 
Brignac, Hérault, France
Brignac, Morbihan, France
Brignac-la-Plaine, Corrèze, France

People 
 Reid Brignac (born 1986), American baseball player

See also 
Armand de Brignac, a French Champagne